France–Venezuela relations are foreign relations between France and Venezuela. France has an embassy in Caracas and Venezuela has an embassy in Paris.

History

During the 1992 Venezuelan coup d'état attempts, the French Government "immediately signalled its refusal to accept a breakdown in institutional legitimacy.

Since the Venezuelan presidential crisis started in 2019, France has supported Juan Guaidó. In February 2019, France joined major EU countries and United States in recognising opposition leader Juan Guaido as Venezuela's interim president.

State visits
President Hugo Chávez met French President Jacques Chirac on three occasions in October 2002, March 2005 and October 2005.

In 2007, Chávez visited French President Nicolas Sarkozy to discuss the situation of hostage Ingrid Betancourt held in Colombia.

In September 2008, Chávez again visited Sarkozy and Chávez said he sought aid from "friendly" countries like France, in exchange for "Venezuelan energy".

Agreements
In October 2008, the Venezuelan and French Foreign Ministers signed 10 agreements on cooperation including bilateral cooperation on energy, military, telecommunications, tourism and fight against drug trafficking.ANd

French investment
In 2000, French company Pechiney signed an agreement with the Venezuela government to invest USD 260 million over three years to expand state-owned bauxite and alumina.

As of 2005, French oil company TotalEnergies was the largest foreign investor in Venezuela. In 2005, Total commenced negotiations with the Venezuelan Government over a possible US$5 billion project to develop heavy oil in eastern Venezuela. In April 2006, the Venezuelan government seized control of foreign owned oil fields including those operated by Total.

Relation with Carlos the Jackal
The president Hugo Chávez is known to have had a sporadic correspondence with convicted terrorist Carlos the Jackal from the latter's prison cell in France. Chávez replied, with a letter in which he addresses Carlos as a "distinguished compatriot".
On June 1, 2006, Chávez referred to him as his "good friend" during a meeting of OPEC countries held in Caracas.

On 20 November 2009, Chávez publicly defended Carlos, saying that "he is wrongly considered to be a bad guy and is to be praised as a key revolutionary fighter, instead."

France summoned the Venezuelan ambassador and demanded an explanation. Chávez, however, declined to retract his comments.

French Response to the 2019 Venezuelan Crisis 
French President Emmanuel Macron sent a tweet stating that if an election was not called in 8 days, France  recognise Juan Guaidó as the "President in charge". Macron also called the 2018 Venezuelan presidential election "illegitimate". He joined the European Union in calling for Venezuelan democracy, and saying that the voices of the people cannot be ignored. Macron also imposed sanctions on Venezuela and boycotted Nicolás Maduro's swearing in as President of Venezuela, as with the rest of the EU.

French oil company Total S.A. evacuated all of its staff in Venezuela after US imposed sanctions, shortly after EU countries imposed sanctions and recognised Guaido as interim President.

See also 
 Foreign relations of France
 Foreign relations of Venezuela

Notes and references

External links 
 French Ministry of Foreign Relations about relations with Venezuela 

 
Venezuela
Bilateral relations of Venezuela